Obertyn (also Obertin) is an urban-type settlement in Ivano-Frankivsk Raion in Ivano-Frankivsk Oblast (region) of western Ukraine. It hosts the administration of Obertyn settlement hromada, one of the hromadas of Ukraine. Population: .

History
The Battle of Obertyn took place here on August 22, 1531, fought between Moldavian Prince Petru Rareş and Polish King Zygmunt Stary. The battle ended with a Polish victory and the reconquest of Pokutia.
The town had an important Jewish community before World War II. In June and September 1942 the Nazis transported Jews of the town to the extermination camp in Bełżec. In 1943 the German occupiers killed nearly all the remaining Jews in Obertyn by shooting them or burning them alive in their houses. Only one child, Christina Carmi, survived the massacre.

Until 18 July 2020, Obertyn belonged to Tlumach Raion. The raion was abolished in July 2020 as part of the administrative reform of Ukraine, which reduced the number of raions of Ivano-Frankivsk Oblast to six. The area of Tlumach Raion was merged into Ivano-Frankivsk Raion.

References

Urban-type settlements in Ivano-Frankivsk Raion
Shtetls
Ruthenian Voivodeship
Holocaust locations in Ukraine